This article lists all power stations in Uganda. As of January 2019, national generation capacity was 1,177 megawatts of electricity. By January 2021, Uganda's generating capacity had increased to 1,268.9 megawatts.

Hydroelectric

Completed

Under construction

Proposed

Thermal

Completed

Proposed

Hybrid

Solar

Completed

Proposed

Geothermal

Proposed

See also

 Energy in Uganda

References

External links
 As of 2019, The World Bank Estimated That 41.3% of Uganda's Population Had Access To Electricity.
Umeme, UETCL Light Up The North As of 2 July 2019.
UEGCL Vows To Bring Down Electricity Tariffs
Uganda’s Energy Sector Grows Despite Challenges
Karuma Power Plant Paves Way For More Hydropower Stations
Albertine Region To Become Uganda's Energy Hub

Uganda
 
Power stations